Alhué is a Chilean town and commune located in Melipilla Province, Santiago Metropolitan Region.

Demographics
Of these, 2,593 (58.5%) lived in urban areas and 1,842 (41.5%) in rural areas. The population grew by 10.5% (422 persons) between the 1992 and 2002 censuses.

Administration
As a commune, Alhué is a third-level administrative division of Chile administered by a municipal council, headed by an alcalde who is directly elected every four years. The 2012-2016 alcalde is Roberto Torres Huerta (Ind.). The communal council has the following members:
 Danilo Salazar Morales (PC)
 Hugo Lazo Segovia (PC)     
 Roberto Aravena Miranda (PDC)
 Mario Huerta Mora (PH)
 Luis Núñez Pérez (PH)
 Nancy Cofré Quiroz (RN)

Within the electoral divisions of Chile, Alhué is represented in the Chamber of Deputies by Denise Pascal (PS) and Gonzalo Uriarte (UDI) as part of the 31st electoral district, (together with Talagante, Peñaflor, El Monte, Isla de Maipo, Melipilla, María Pinto, Curacaví, San Pedro and Padre Hurtado). The commune is represented in the Senate by Guido Girardi Lavín (PPD) and Jovino Novoa Vásquez (UDI) as part of the 7th senatorial constituency (Santiago-West).

References

External links
 Municipality of Alhué

Communes of Chile
Populated places in Melipilla Province